The tournament acted as the South American qualifying tournament for the 2012 FIFA Futsal World Cup in Thailand. It was held from 15 to 22 April 2012 in Gramado, Brazil. It was the first time a tournament different from Copa América qualified to the World Cup: the semi-finalists were qualified.

Group stage
The draw was held on 3 March 2011. Ten teams were drawn into two groups. The top two finishers advanced to the semi-finals and qualified to the 2012 FIFA Futsal World Cup.

Group A

Group B

Knockout stage

9th place match

7th place match

Semi-finals

5th place match

Third place play-off

Final

Final classification

Awards

 Most Valuable Player
 Fabio Alcaraz

References

External links
FIFA website
Tournament at futsalplanet.com

FIFA Futsal World Cup qualification (CONMEBOL)
2012 FIFA Futsal World Cup
2012 in futsal